Lotewadi is a village situated in Sangole, Solapur district in the Indian state of Maharashtra.
It is famous for Mhasoba temple. There are three main parts in Lotewadi are Lotewadi Navi, Lotewadi Juni and Satarkar Vasti.

Mhasoba Temple in Lotewadi is owned by the Shivaji descendent Udayanraje Bhosale. The annual turnover at the temple is @ 5 crores. The Mhasoba Temple is very Crowded place on the Amavashya Day. All the peoples surrounded to lotewadi @ 50 km comes to here on Amavashya. The crowd on Amavasya day is around 10,000 to 20,000 people.

Udayanraje Bhosale family has own Rajwada in the Lotewadi.

The Royal Udayan Raje family has @1000 hectares of land in Lotewadi,  which they have given to the farmers of Lotewadi for the Farming. All the Peoples in Lotewadi Prouds of the Shivaji.

Farmers are taking cash crops as pomegranate in majority. Other crops as Jawar,  Bajari etc.

The Peoples of Surname Lavate are in Majority in Lotewadi. Other Surnames in Lotewadi are Sargar, kale, kalebag, Javir, Deshmukh, Kate, Jadhav, Shejal, Dhere, More, Mote, Kumbhar, Kasar, Kengar, Deshpande, Kulkarni, Mane, Shembade, Sawant, Sartape, Sathe, Dhandore, Chavhan, Hajare, Sutar, Kolekar.

Political people in Lotewadi are Uttam Khandekar, Popat Sawant, Ad Shankar Sargar, Dada Lavate, Ulhas Dhere, Ramchandra Lavate, Rahul Sawant, Kolekar, Ramchandra Patil, Ramhari Sawant.

Political Party are Shekap, Shivasena etc.

Villages in Solapur district